Rusanovo is a rural locality (a village) in Fominskoye Rural Settlement, Sheksninsky District, Vologda Oblast, Russia. The population was 13 as of 2002.

Geography 
Rusanovo is located 56 km southeast of Sheksna (the district's administrative centre) by road. Fominskoye is the nearest rural locality.

References 

Rural localities in Sheksninsky District